Peter Brabeck-Letmathe (born 13 November 1944) is an Austrian businessman. He is the chairman emeritus, former chairman and CEO of the Nestlé Group, and former chairman of Formula One.

Early life
Brabeck-Letmathe was born in Villach, Austria, into a family with its origins in Iserlohn-Letmathe in north-western Germany. He studied economics at the University of World Trade (today Vienna University of Economics and Business).

Early career at Nestlé
He joined Nestlé in 1968 in Austria as a salesman, later becoming a specialist for new products. His career within the group included a span of almost 10 years in Chile (1970–1980), first as national sales manager and later as director of marketing. In 1981, he was appointed managing director of Nestlé Ecuador and in 1983, president and managing director of Nestlé Venezuela. In October 1987, he was transferred to Nestlé's international headquarters in Vevey. As senior vice-president in charge of the Culinary Products Division, he had worldwide responsibility for that business area. On 1 January 1992, Brabeck-Letmathe was appointed executive vice-president of Nestlé S.A., with global responsibility for the Strategic Business Group encompassing food, Buitoni pasta, chocolate and confectionery, ice cream, pet food, as well as industrial products (aromas). At the same time, he had worldwide responsibility for marketing, communications and public affairs. In particular, during his time as executive vice-president, he conceived and implemented the unique branding policy of Nestlé, characterized by a strict hierarchy of strategic brands on the global, regional and local level.

CEO of Nestlé
On 5 June 1997, he was elected to the board of directors, and appointed chief executive officer of Nestlé S.A. On 6 April 2001, the board of directors elected him as vice-chairman, and in April 2005, chairman of the board.

In 2008, Brabeck-Letmathe stepped down as CEO.

Views on water charges
Brabeck-Letmathe (credited as Peter Brabeck) appeared in the 2005 documentary We Feed the World and while speaking on the subject of water, he said "It's a question of whether we should privatize the normal water supply for the population. And there are two different opinions on the matter. The one opinion, which I think is extreme, is represented by the NGOs, who bang on about declaring water a public right. That means that as a human being you should have a right to water. That's an extreme solution. The other view says that water is a foodstuff like any other, and like any other foodstuff it should have a market value." He added, "Personally, I believe it's better to give a foodstuff a value so that we're all aware it has its price, and then that one should take specific measures for the part of the population that has no access to this water." Following controversy on social media about these remarks, he stated that he does believe that water for basic hygiene and drinking is indeed a human right. He went on to say that his remarks were intended to address overconsumption by some while others suffered from lack of water and further that his remarks were taken out of context by the documentary.

Other responsibilities
Brabeck-Letmathe was on the board of directors of Credit Suisse Group, L'Oréal, and ExxonMobil. He is also a member of ERT (European Round Table of Industrialists) and a member of the foundation board of the World Economic Forum. His earnings in 2006 were approximately 14 million Swiss francs (9 million Euro).

Selected bibliography
 2014: Business in a Changing Society
 2016: Nutrition for a Better Life

References

External links 
 Nestlé Corporate Website 

1944 births
Directors of ExxonMobil
Chairmen of Nestlé
Living people
Nestlé people
People from Villach
Austrian chairpersons of corporations
Formula One people
Vienna University of Economics and Business alumni